The Hexagonal Galleries is an hour-long work by Cuban composer Armando Rodriguez Ruidiaz.

Composition and structure
Based on a short story by Jorge Luis Borges, this piece was commissioned by the South Florida Composers Alliance and premiered at the Wolfson Campus Auditorium of the Miami Dade Community College in Miami, Florida, on 13 April 1992. The Hexagonal Galleries is comprised by seven sections named as follows:
 The Hexagonal Galleries
 The Mirror
 The spiral Staircase
 MCVMCVMCVMCVMCV
 Labyrinth
 Cryptographs
 Limitless and Periodic

Performance

The piece was performed by its composer, Armando Rodriguez Ruidiaz, along with Venezuelan composer Gustavo Matamoros and Cuban pianist Carmen Carrodeguas, all of them members of PUNTO Experimental Music Ensemble, a contemporary music group active in Miami, Florida, during the 1990s.

References

External links
Armando Rodríguez Ruidíaz. YouTube. - The Hexagonal Galleries - 7 - Limitless and Periodic – 1992.
Rawlinson, Kate: On the "Hexagonal Galleries", scribd, 2013 

1992 compositions
Experimental music compositions
Electronic compositions